The Man at the Carlton is a 1931 crime novel by the British writer Edgar Wallace.

Film adaptation
In 1961 it was turned into the film Man at the Carlton Tower, directed by Robert Tronson as part of a long-running series of Wallace films made at Merton Park Studios.

References

Bibliography
 Goble, Alan. The Complete Index to Literary Sources in Film. Walter de Gruyter, 1999.

1931 British novels
Novels by Edgar Wallace
British crime novels
British novels adapted into films
Hodder & Stoughton books
Doubleday, Doran books